Pulavankadu is a village in the Orathanadu taluk of Thanjavur district, Tamil Nadu, India.

Demographics 

As per the 2001 census, Pulavankadu had a total population of 1665 with 804 males and 861 females. The sex ratio was 1071. The literacy rate was 73.72.

References 

 

Villages in Thanjavur district